Simon Zadek (born 16 July 1957) is a writer and advisor focused on business and sustainability. He is the Co-Director of the UNEP Inquiry into the Design of a Sustainable Financial System.

Background
Zadek grew up in London, later attending Bristol University (BSc Economics, 1979). He has a PhD in Economics from Brunel University (An economics of Utopia: the democratisation of scarcity, 1992). He reports that the dissertation topic was rejected by potential supervisors at the University of Oxford and LSE, before he enrolled at Brunel.  Most recently he has lived in China and Geneva.

Career
Zadek has held a number of positions broadly concerned with supporting alternative economic development and sustainable business activity. He is Co-Director of the UNEP Inquiry into the Design of a Sustainable Financial System, which started in 2014 in Geneva.

From 1979 to 1981 he was an economic planner for the Government of St Lucia, followed by a period of consulting with Coopers and Lybrand. In 1992 he joined the New Economics Foundation, becoming its Development Director and leading its work on corporate social responsibility. He helped to found AccountAbility in 1995, acting as its CEO from 2002 to 2009, and was Founding Chair of the Ethical Trading Initiative.

Positions in academic institutions have included:
Visiting Fellow at the University of Sussex
Visiting Professor at Copenhagen Business School
Honorary Professor at the University of South Africa
Senior Fellow at the Centre for Government and Business of Harvard University's Kennedy School (until 2011)
Visiting Scholar at Tsinghua School of Economics and Management in Beijing
 Visiting Professor, DSM Senior Fellow in Partnership and Sustainability, Singapore Management University (2018)

He is also been an advisor to several green and business initiatives, including the Centre for International Governance Innovation (CIGI), the World Economic Forum, and the International Institute for Sustainable Development (IISD).

Contributions
Zadek's early interests were in alternative, utopian, and Buddhist economics. But he became interested in the corporate social responsibility movement and particularity the development of social auditing techniques, when working at the New Economics Foundation (1992–1999) and then as founder and CEO of AccountAbility (1995–2009). Latterly he has worked on promoting green and responsible financial policies across the banking, insurance and investment sectors. He has developed environmental and social risk policies for banks and corporate clients, and argues insurers need to report their exposure to climate risks and their strategies for resilience.

Recognition
In 2003 he was named as one of the World Economic Forum's 'Global Leaders of Tomorrow'.

Zadek's book, The Civil Corporation: the New Economy of Corporate Citizenship (2001/2007) received the Academy of Management's Best Book Social Issues Award in 2006 and has been called one of the most influential books on sustainability, by the Cambridge Programme for Sustainability Leadership.

Writings

Books
 Simon Zadek. 2015. Eco-China Inc. Routledge, London. 
 Simon Zadek. 2001/2007. The Civil Corporation: the New Economy of Corporate Citizenship, Earthscan, London (2001, Second edition 2007)		
 Simon Zadek, Peter Raynard. 2006. Tomorrow’s History: Selected Writings	of	Simon Zadek: 1994-2003. Earthscan, London (2006). . ch 1
 (With Niels	Højensgård	and	Peter	Raynard	(editors), Perspectives	on	the	New Economy	of	Corporate	Citizenship,	The	Copenhagen	Centre,	Copenhagen (2000)
 (With Jutta Blauert (editors)) Mediating	Sustainability from	the	Grassroots,	Kumarian,	Hartford CT (1998)
 (With Peter Pruzan	and	Richard	Evans (editors))		Building	Corporate	Accountability:	Emerging	Practices	in	Social	and	Ethical	Accounting	and	Auditing.	Earthscan,	London (1997)
 Thake, Stephen and Simon Zadek (1997) Practical People, Noble Causes: How to Support Community Social Entrepreneurs, New Economics Foundation, London
 An	Economics	of	Utopia:	the	Democratisation	of	Scarcity.	Avebury, Aldershot (1992)

Selected articles and working papers
 Zadek, Simon (2017). Partnership alchemy: engagement, innovation and governance. In Perspectives on corporate citizenship edited by Jörg Andriof and Malcolm McIntosh. London: Routledge.  
Zadek,	Simon,	Maya Forstater and	Kelly	Yu (2012) The	Political Economy of Responsible Business in	China,	Journal	of	Current	Chinese	Affairs,	July	2012
Zadek,	Simon	(2011)	Civil	Society	and	Market	Transformation,	in	Michael	Edwards	(ed.),	The	Oxford Handbook	of	Civil	Society.	Oxford	and	New	York:	Oxford	University	Press,	Oxford*Zadek,	Simon	(2011),	“Beyond	Climate	Finance:	From	Accountability	to	Productivity	in	Addressing the	Climate	Challenge”,	Climate	Policy,	Volume	11,	Issue	3,	June	2011:	1058-1068
Zadek,	Simon	(2010)	“Emerging	Nations	and	Sustainability:	Chimera	or	Leadership?”, Politeia,	XXVI,	98,	2010.	ISSN 1128-2401	pp.	153-167	(reproduced	by	Harvard	University	as	Working	Paper,	2010)
Forstater,	Maya,	Simon	Zadek,	Yang	Guang,	Kelly	Yu,	Chen	Xiao	Hong,	Mark	George	(2010)	Corporate	Responsibility	in	African	Development,	Working	Paper,	Corporate	Social	Responsibility	Initiative,	Harvard	Kennedy	School,	Cambridge,	Mass.
Zadek,	Simon	(2008)	Collaborative	Governance:	the	New	Multilateralism	for	the	21st	Century,	in	Global	Development	2.0,	Brookings	Institution,	Washington	DC
Zadek,	Simon	and	Alex MacGillivray	(2008)	“Responsible	Competitiveness:	Making	Sustainability	Count	in	Global	Markets”,	Harvard	International	Review,	Summer	2008:	72-77
Zadek,	Simon	(2006)	“Corporate	Responsibility	and	Competitiveness	at the	Macro	Level”,	Corporate	Governance:	Vol	6,	No	4.,	2006:	334-348
 Zadek,	Simon	and	Sasha	Radovich	(2006)	Governing	 Collaborative	Governance:	Enhancing Development	 Outcomes	by	Improving Partnership Governance	and	Accountability,	Working	Paper 23, Corporate Social Responsibility Initiative,	Harvard	Kennedy	School,	Cambridge,	Mass.	
Zadek,	Simon	(2006)	The	Logic	of	Collaborative	Governance:	Corporate	Responsibility,	Accountability,	and	the	Social	Contract,	Working	Paper	17,	Corporate 	Social	Responsibility	Initiative,	Harvard	Kennedy	School, Cambridge,	Mass.
Zadek,	Simon	(2004)	The path	to	Corporate	Responsibility,	Harvard	Business	Review,	December	2004

The Guardian articles

References

External links
www.zadek.net (dead link, 2018)
www.opendemocracy.net/author/simon-zadek 
www.guardian.co.uk/profile/simon-zadek
 

Living people
Writers from London
British male writers
Economics writers
1957 births